Miquel Ferrer i Aymamí (28 November 1931 – 2 January 2021) was a Spanish professional footballer. His professional career spanned through most of the 1950s, when he played as a midfielder.

Club career
Barcelona was Ferrer's amateur team in 1948, when he was 16. From 1949 to 1951, he played for Condal. He first played professionally for Barcelona in 1951, starting his first match on 30 September of that year against Valencia CF. He only played two league games for Barcelona, but played 22 unofficial matches for the club.

In 1954, Ferrer joined Real Oviedo. He retired following the 1958 season at the age of 26. His best career performance was in 1957, when he scored 12 goals in the Segunda División.

References

1931 births
2021 deaths
People from Baix Camp
Sportspeople from the Province of Tarragona
Spanish footballers
Footballers from Catalonia
Association football midfielders
FC Barcelona players
CD Condal players
Real Oviedo players
La Liga players
Segunda División players